Bradon McDonald (born May 14, 1975 in Watertown, New York) is an American fashion designer and a modern dancer from "Mark Morris Dance Group".

Early life and education
Bradon McDonald is a graduate of the Juilliard School (1997) and a recipient of the Princess Grace Award and a National ARTS Foundation award.  He performed with the Limón Dance Company for three years.  As a dancer with the Mark Morris Dance Group from 2000 to 2010, McDonald danced many of the roles that Mark Morris originally made for himself.

Design career
McDonald began designing while dancing, then enrolled in the Fashion Institute of Design & Merchandising (FIDM) in Los Angeles in 2010, immediately after leaving MMDG. He participated in Project Runway (season 12)‚ where he made it to the finale, but did not win. In the fourth episode of the competition which he won, he proposed to his partner.

References

External links
https://web.archive.org/web/20131012032928/http://www.mylifetime.com/shows/project-runway/season-12/designers/Bradon-McDonald

1975 births
American fashion designers
LGBT people from New York (state)
LGBT fashion designers
Living people
Artists from Los Angeles
Project Runway (American series) participants
Juilliard School alumni
People from Watertown, New York
21st-century LGBT people